Intramolecular describes a process or phenomenon that occurs within a molecule. It can refer to:
Intramolecular reaction
Intramolecular force

See also